Pavlovichi is a rural locality (a selo) in Suzemsky District, Bryansk Oblast, Russia. The population was 199 as of 2010. There are 4 streets.

Geography 
Pavlovichi is located 17 km southeast of Suzemka (the district's administrative centre) by road. Polevye Novosyolki is the nearest rural locality.

References 

Rural localities in Suzemsky District